Agapanthia annularis is a species of beetle in the family Cerambycidae. It was described by Guillaume-Antoine Olivier in 1795.

References

annularis
Beetles described in 1795